Nanxi (南戲) or xiwen (戲文) was an early form of Chinese opera, developed from ancient traditions of mime, singing, and dancing during the Song dynasty in the 12th century.  The name means literally Southern drama, and the form originated in the area around Wenzhou in southeastern China. Nanxi is an abbreviation of nanqu xiwen (南曲戲文, "Southern music theatre text") or nan xiwen.

Nanxi started as combinations of Song plays and local folk songs and ballads, using colloquial language with many scenes.   Due to its coarse language, rough prosody, and unsophisticated literary style, Nanxi was considered a low art form during the Song and Yuan dynasties. However, its status was elevated with Tale of the Pipa written by Gao Ming, a play of better literary quality and more complex structure. It was highly regarded by the Ming Hongwu Emperor. By the middle of the Ming dynasty, Nanxi had developed into a more complex dramatic form known as chuanqi, of which is kunqu is a branch.

Performance
In Nanxi opera, as with western operetta, spoken passages alternated with verses (qu 曲) set to popular music. Professional companies of actors performed nanxi in theatres that could hold thousands of spectators.
Nanxi had seven role types, many of which were seen in later Chinese opera forms.  Sheng were heroic male characters and dan heroines.  Mo (末), jing, chou, wai (外), and hou (后, also called tie 貼) were less defined roles, and actors in these role types portrayed a variety of characters in the same play.  The role types of later forms of Chinese opera were made more strict, but can be seen to have their roots in nanxi.

Works
Nanxi was considered a low art form and thus ignored in contemporary historiography, and it was almost forgotten by scholars after the mid-16th century. Of the large numbers of nanxi originally written, only 283 titles and 20 play texts survive. Complete scripts of three works were found in the 1920s, the earliest of which is a work from the Southern Song, The No. 1 Scholar Zhang Xie (張協狀元). The story tells of Zhang Xie, who on the way to the capital to take the imperial examination, is robbed and injured by bandits. He is nursed back to health by a local maiden, whom he then marries. She then pays for him to continue to the capital to take the examination, in which he wins first place. However, when his wife tries to meet him in the capital, he rejects her for her lowly origins, and later tries to kill her and she is gravely injured falling off a cliff. She is saved by the Prime Minister who happens to pass by, and adopts her as his daughter. Later Zhang asks the Prime Minister to marry his daughter, and on the wedding night, finds that she is the wife he tried to kill.

Most Nanxi works from before the end of Yuan dynasty were produced by anonymous authors. The first work with a known author is Tale of the Pipa by Gao Ming. The play tells the story of an abandoned wife who set off on a 12-year journey to find her husband, surviving by playing the pipa. The play became a model for Ming dynasty drama as it was the favorite opera of the first Ming emperor.

Other notable Nanxi plays following the Tale of the Pipa include The Thorn Hairpin (荊釵記), The White Rabbit (白兔記), The Moon Pavilion (拜月亭), and Killing Dog (殺狗記). Some of the missing plays such as Liu Wenlong and the Water Chestnut Mirror have been preserved in other languages.

Notes

Sources
Encyclopædia Britannica 2006. Encyclopædia Britannica Premium Service. 19 January 2006 nanxi
Cultures & Literatures of Asia — Cora Agatucci

Chinese opera
Wenzhou
Culture in Zhejiang
Song dynasty art